Cardiff Council elections take place for the whole council every five years, to Cardiff Council (officially the County Council of the City and County of Cardiff) in south Wales. It came into being as a unitary authority on 1 April 1996, after the passing of the Local Government (Wales) Act 1994. In 2014 the National Assembly for Wales deferred all local elections in Wales to 2017. The council is composed of 75 councillors.

Between 1974 and 1996 Cardiff Council was a district council of South Glamorgan (the city also electing councillors to the county council). Prior to 1974 Cardiff Council governed a county borough, separate from the county of Glamorgan.

Political control
Since the current council was established as a unitary authority in 1995, political control has been held by the following parties:

Council elections
1987 Cardiff City Council election
1991 Cardiff City Council election
1995 Cardiff Council election
1999 Cardiff Council election
2004 Cardiff Council election
2008 Cardiff Council election
2012 Cardiff Council election
2017 Cardiff Council election
2022 Cardiff Council election

City result maps

By-election results

1995–1999

Fairwater

Plasnewydd

The by-election was called following the election of Cllr. Julie Morgan as the Member for the Parliamentary constituency of Cardiff North.

Rhiwbina

1999–2004

Cyncoed

 

The by-election was called following the resignation of Cllr. Jenny Randerson.

Canton

The by-election was called following the election of Cllr. Kevin Brennan as the Member for the Parliamentary constituency of Cardiff West.

Llandaff North

Gabalfa

Pentwyn

The by-election was called following the resignation of Cllr. Bill Cookson.

2004–2008
There were no by-elections.

2008–2012

Pentyrch

The by-election was called following the resignation of Cllr. Simon Roberts.

Riverside

The by-election was called following the resignation of Cllr. Gwenllian Lansdown.

2012–2017

Riverside

The by-election was caused by the resignation of Labour councillor Phil Hawkins for personal reasons.

Splott

A by-election was caused by the resignation of Labour councillor Luke Holland following accusations of non-attendance at council meetings. He stated that he planned to move to London.

Canton

The by-election was caused by the resignation of Labour Councillor Cerys Furlong on 30 December 2013.

Llandaff North

The by-election was caused by the resignation of Labour councillor Siobhan Corria for personal reasons.

Pentyrch

The by-election was caused by the resignation of Labour Councillor Craig Williams, following his election as MP for Cardiff North.

Riverside

The by-election was caused by the resignation of Labour councillor Cecilia Love for family reasons.

Plasnewydd

The by-election was caused by the death of Labour councillor Mohammed Javed.

Grangetown

The by-election was caused by the death of Labour councillor Chris Lomax.

2017–2022

Ely

The by-election was caused by the death of Labour councillor Jim Murphy on 1 December 2018.

Cyncoed

The by-election was caused by the death of Liberal Democrat Councillor Wendy Congreve on 14 May 2019.

Whitchurch & Tongwynlais

The by-election was caused by the death of Conservative councillor Tim Davies on 4 June 2019.

Llanishen

The by-election was caused by the resignation of Labour councillor Phil Bale in Autumn 2019.

Heath

The by-election was called following the resignation of Cllr. Fenella Bowden who resigned for health reasons.

2022–2026

See also
 1889 Cardiff County Borough Council election

References

 
Council elections in South Glamorgan